Trud-Rassvet is a rural locality (a khutor) in Panfilovskoye Rural Settlement, Novoanninsky District, Volgograd Oblast, Russia. The population was 110 as of 2010. There are 4 streets.

Geography 
Trud-Rassvet is located in steppe on the Khopyorsko-Buzulukskaya Plain, 34 km southeast of Novoanninsky (the district's administrative centre) by road. Troyetsky is the nearest rural locality.

References 

Rural localities in Novoanninsky District